Helge Skoog (born 6 August 1938 in Borås, Sweden) is a Swedish actor and comedian, who became well known during the 1980s appearing on the TV series Teatersport. During the 2000s (decade), he took part in the TV program Parlamentet.

Skog was married to Busk Margit Jonsson from 1964-1977.

In February–March 2015, he acted as the narrator voice in the TV programme Klockan nio hos stjärnorna.

Filmography 
1970 - Baltutlämningen
1976 - Near and Far Away
1981 - Babels hus (TV)
1981 - Beteendelek (TV play)
1984 - Pengarna gör mannen (TV film)
1985 - Skrotnisse och hans vänner (voice actor)
1986 - Fläskfarmen
1986 - Bröderna Mozart
1988 - Allra käraste syster
1989 - T. Sventon praktiserande privatdetektiv
2000 - Jönssonligan spelar högt
2005 - Kommissionen (TV series)
2008–2013 - Halv åtta hos mig (TV series) (narrator)

References

External links 

1938 births
Living people
People from Borås
Swedish male actors
Swedish comedians